is an NHK documentary television series of "specials" covering contemporary China. The series first aired in April 2007 with a prologue followed by the first episode on consecutive nights. The programs come out at irregular intervals, the first were in April, as mentioned, May, and June; the fourth is scheduled for August.

Topics covered include China's ageing society and problems with water shortages.

The series' kanji name is a keyword detectable by China's internet control system.

External links
 http://www.nhk.or.jp/special/onair/chugoku.html
 http://www.nhk.or.jp/special/world/index.html
 https://web.archive.org/web/20070930011340/http://www3.nhk.or.jp/pr/keiei/shiryou/soukyoku/2007/02/005.pdf
 http://news.searchina.ne.jp/disp.cgi?y=2007&d=1120&f=column_1120_002.shtml

NHK
Japanese documentary television series
Japanese travel television series
2000s Japanese television series
2000s documentary television series